Image meta search (or image search engine) is a type of search engine specialised on finding pictures, images, animations etc. Like the text search, image search is an information retrieval system designed to help to find information on the Internet and it allows the user to look for images etc. using keywords or search phrases and to receive a set of thumbnail images, sorted by relevancy.

Specialised search engines, like in the fields of image search, are among the fastest growing search services on the internet. In 2005 alone the number of image searches increased by 91% (Nielsen/NetRatings 2006-03-31).

The most common search engines today offer image search such as Google, Yahoo or Bing!.

How image search works

A common misunderstanding when it comes to image search is that the technology is based on detecting information in the image itself. But most image search works as other search engines. The metadata of the image is indexed and stored in a large database and when a search query is performed the image search engine looks up the index, and queries are matched with the stored information. The results are presented in order of relevancy. The usefulness of an image search engine depends on the relevance of the results it returns, and the ranking algorithms are one of the keys to becoming a big player. 

Some search engines can automatically identify a limited range of visual content, e.g. faces, trees, sky, buildings, flowers, colours etc. This can be used alone, as in content-based image retrieval, or to augment metadata in an image search. 

When performing a search the user receives a set of thumbnail images, sorted by relevancy. Each thumbnail is a link back to the original web site where that image is located. Using an advanced search option the user can typically adjust the search criteria to fit their own needs, choosing to search only images or animations, color or black and white, and setting preferences on image size.

Image search providers
AltaVista 
Corbis
GazoPa (similar image search, has been shut down for consumer, still available for business user)
Google Image Search (also reverse image search)
Live Search from Microsoft 
Macroglossa ( visual search engine )
Picollator 
Picsearch
Pixsta
TinEye (only reverse image search)
Yandex Search (also reverse image search)

See also
 Wikimedia Commons to search Wikipedia's images.

References 

Image search
Internet search engines
Internet search algorithms